The 1933 Brisbane Rugby League season was the 25th season of Brisbane's semi-professional rugby league football competition. Seven teams across Brisbane competed for the premiership, which culminated in Fortitude Valley defeating minor premiers Western Suburbs 9–3 in the final. As minor premiers, Wests were allowed a grand final challenge, which resulted in Fortitude Valley winning 18–5, and were thus, considered the premiers.

Ladder

Finals

References 

Rugby league in Brisbane
1933 in Australian rugby league
1933 in rugby league